Bolboceratidae is a family of beetle. It was historically treated as a subfamily of the earth-boring dung beetles, or "dor beetles" (family Geotrupidae), but has been considered a separate family by many authors since 1995. Some recent classifications have persisted in treating bolboceratids as a subfamily (e.g.) but these classifications are contradicted by recent phylogenetic studies of relationships indicating that bolboceratids are not closely related to geotrupids (e.g., that bolboceratids are more closely related to Pleocomidae and Passalidae).

Genera

 Athyreus
 Australobolbus
 Blackbolbus
 Blackburnium
 Bolbaffer
 Bolbaffroides
 Bolbelasmus
 Bolbobaineus
 Bolbocaffer
 Bolbocerastes
 Bolboceratex
 Bolboceratops
 Bolbocerodema
 Bolboceroides
 Bolbocerosoma
 Bolbochromus
 Bolbogonium
 Bolbohamatum
 Bolboleaus
 Bolborhachium
 Bolborhinum
 Bolborhombus
 Bolbothyreus
 Bolbotrypes
 Bradycinetulus
 Cretobolbus
 Elephastomus
 Eubolbitus
 Eucanthus
 Gilletinus
 Halffterobolbus
 Meridiobolbus
 Mesoathyreus
 Mimobolbus
 Namibiobolbus
 Namibiotrupes
 Neoathyreus
 Odonteus
 Parabolbapium
 Parathyreus
 Pereirabolbus
 Prototrupes
 Pseudoathyreus
 Socotrabolbus
 Somalobolbus
 Senaspidius
 Zefevazia

Fossil genera 

 †Amberathyreus Bai and Zhang 2017 Burmese amber, Myanmar, Cenomanian
 †Cretobolbus Nikolajev 1996, Zaza Formation, Russia, Aptian

References

External links
 Encyclopedia of Life entry

 
Beetle families